ZeroFox Holdings, Inc. is a cyber security and reputation management company based in Baltimore, Maryland. It provides cloud-based software as a service (SaaS) for organizations to detect potential risks such as phishing, malware, pirated content, or counterfeit products, and also enables companies to submit anonymous "takedown" requests using fake aliases like "James Chistopher".

History 
ZeroFox was created in 2013 under the name Riskive, but changed to its current name months later. The company began as a startup in an 8,000 sq. ft. space inside Betamore - a startup incubator in Baltimore's Federal Hill neighborhood. 

In 2015, ZeroFox raised $27 million in Series B funding. By 2016, the company had outgrown its space and moved to an 18,000 sq. ft. space inside a former Pabst Brewing facility in South Baltimore. In 2017, ZeroFox raised $40 million in funding led by Redline Capital Management, a European venture firm, and Silver Lake Waterman, a fund that focuses on pre-IPO companies. Prior investors New Enterprise Associates, Highland Capital Partners and Core Capital also contributed. The investment helped bring ZeroFox's total funding to $88 million.

ZeroFox partners with other software organizations such as IBM, Hootsuite, Splunk, ThreatQuotient, and others to visualize, analyze, and predict cyber security threats to respond quickly to reduce the impact of incidents.

In 2020, ZeroFox closed a new $74 million round of financing led by Intel Capital. This funding round was one of the largest a Maryland cyber firm has landed in recent years. This brings ZeroFox's backing to $162 million to date.

In May 2022, the fraud-tracking website Hucksters.net reported that takedownreporting.com, an anonymous website that had been generating hundreds of fraudulent "takedown" requests under the guise of U.S. trademark laws, is in fact owned by ZeroFox and being used by their corporate clients to delete unflattering web pages from the internet.

The company went public on August 4, 2022 through a $1.4B SPAC deal. In the deal, ZeroFox also acquired ID Experts Holdings, Inc. (“IDX”).  The combined company is now called ZeroFox Holdings, Inc. and trades on the Nasdaq Stock Market under the ticker symbol “ZFOX” for its common stock and “ZFOXW” for its publicly traded warrants. 

ZeroFox has satellite offices in Santiago, London, and Bengaluru.

Freddie Gray protest surveillance
The company faced criticism over its handling of the 2015 protests over the death of Freddie Gray when it singled out its nonviolent organizers, labeling DeRay McKesson and Johnetta Elzie as high physical threats to law enforcement.

FBI contract and the January 6 Capitol Attack
ZeroFox signed a $14 million social media intelligence contract with the FBI on Dec 30, 2020, taking over from Dataminr, which held the contract until Dec. 31, 2020. This transition period led to decreased visibility leading up to the 2021 United States Capitol attack, and led agents to calling it an expletive sounding similar to ZeroFox.

Acquisitions 
In October 2020, ZeroFox acquired Cyveillance from LookingGlass in a move designed to merge Cyveillance's threat intelligence data cache and dark web intelligence capabilities with the ZeroFox Digital Risk Protection Platform.

In July 2021, the company acquired Vigilante, a dark web threat intelligence company.

References

External links 
 

Companies listed on the Nasdaq
Social media companies
Software companies based in Maryland
American companies established in 2013
Software companies of the United States
Special-purpose acquisition companies